Harrison Rittenhouse Kincaid (January 3, 1836 – October 2, 1920) was an American printer, journalist, Republican politician, and university regent who served as Oregon Secretary of State between 1895 and 1899.

Biography
Kincaid was born to Thomas Kincaid and Nancy Chodrick in Fall Creek Township, Indiana, moving to Eugene, Oregon, in 1853, at the age of 17. He found work as a miner along Althouse Creek, later attending Columbia College. Kincaid worked as a journalist after his graduation, serving as a clerk in the United States Senate between 1858 and 1879.

Oregon Secretary of State
Kincaid was elected Oregon Secretary of State in 1894, assuming office on January 14, 1895. He left office on January 9, 1899. Kincaid won election to the office over Prohibitionist F. Kercher, Democrat Charles Nickell, and Populist Ira Wakefield.

Personal life
Kincaid married Augusta A. Lockwood in 1873. They had one son, Webster Lockwood Kincaid, who himself had two sons.

References

1836 births
1920 deaths
Secretaries of State of Oregon
Oregon Republicans
Politicians from Eugene, Oregon
Journalists from Oregon
Journalists from Indiana
American male journalists